Market Wrap is a show on CNBC that aired between 4pm and 6pm ET, and was replaced by Closing Bell on Feb 4, 2002. The series was premiered in 1989 as Market Wrap-Up was Anchored by Bill Griffeth and others. In 1996 when Cavuto leaving from CNBC for Fox News Channel and  Sister Network financial Unit.

European Market Wrap was the equivalent program on CNBC Europe, but it was replaced by European Closing Bell in 2003.

There was also a program on CNBC Asia called Asia Market Wrap, but it ended on December 2, 2005, and was replaced by Worldwide Exchange on December 19, 2005.

Market Wrap anchors

Worldwide Market Wrap
Around CNBC's global branches, there are many counterparts of Market Wrap in the world:

1989 American television series debuts
2002 American television series endings
1980s American television talk shows
1990s American television talk shows
2000s American television talk shows
1980s American television news shows
1990s American television news shows
2000s American television news shows
CNBC original programming
CNBC Asia original programming
Business-related television series